The Children of the Lost is a young adult fantasy novel by David Whitley. It is the sequel to his debut novel, The Midnight Charter, and was first published in 2010. It continues Mark and Lilly's journey after they are banished from Agora in the first book.

Concept
The book is set in a fantasy world called Agora, which is governed by an extreme form of capitalism. Anything can be bought and sold- including thoughts, ideas, emotions and ultimately people. Children are traded by their parents, and even on their twelfth birthday they are  allowed to become traders themselves.

There is no money in Agora. Instead, people are ranked according to their reputation. It only takes a small rumour or wrongdoing to send even the most powerful merchant down to the bottom, where they normally become "debtors". With nothing left to trade, they are stuck at the bottom, with no means to climb back up the social hierarchy.

Agora is surrounded by walls. Nobody can enter the city, and nobody leave the city. The city itself is split into twelve districts, all named after Zodiac signs. The Director of Receipts watches over the city, and his Receivers police it.

Characters
Mark: a fourteen-year-old boy who replaced Count Stelli as Agora's greatest astrologer.
Lily: a fourteen-year-old girl who began the almshouse.
Dr Theophilus: nephew of Count Stelli. Works as a doctor. Helps Lily run the almshouse.
Count Stelli: an old astrologist. He is Agora's greatest astrologist.
Mr Snutworth: Mark's manservant
Director of Receipts: Highest authority in Agora

See also
The Midnight Charter
The Canticle of Whispers
David Whitley

External links
Official Site

References

2010 British novels
Young adult fantasy novels
British fantasy novels
British young adult novels
Novels by David Whitley
Puffin Books books